Edilma is a female given name. The origin of the name Edilma is Greek and means "Remains Young".  Edilma comes from the Greek Edelia and is commonly used in countries where Latin languages are speaking.  Many Edilmas are found in Latin America and Spain. 

Given names